The Abominable Dr. Phibes is a 1971 British dark comedy horror film, produced by Ronald S. Dunas and Louis M. Heyward, directed by Robert Fuest, written by William Goldstein and James Whiton, and starring Vincent Price and Joseph Cotten. Its art deco sets, dark humour, and performance by Price have made the film and its sequel Dr. Phibes Rises Again cult classics. The film also features Terry-Thomas and Hugh Griffith, with an uncredited Caroline Munro appearing as Phibes' wife.

The film follows the title character, Dr Anton Phibes, who blames the medical team that attended to his wife's surgery four years prior for her death and sets out to exact vengeance on each one. Phibes is inspired in his murderous spree by the Ten Plagues of Egypt from the Old Testament. However, the Ten Plagues in the film considerably differ from those in the literary Old Testament; some plagues were dropped, new plagues were added, and even those plagues which remain the same are ordered differently, such as the death of the first-born no longer being the final plague.

Plot
Dr. Anton Phibes, a famous concert organist with doctorates in both music and theology, is believed to have been killed in a car crash in Switzerland in 1921, while racing home upon hearing of the death of his beloved wife, Victoria, during surgery. Phibes survived the crash, but was horribly scarred and left unable to speak. He remade his face with prosthetics and used his knowledge of acoustics to regain his voice. Resurfacing secretly in London in 1925, Phibes believes his wife was a victim of her doctors' incompetence, and begins elaborate plans to kill those he believes are guilty for her death.

Aided in his quest for vengeance by his beautiful and silent assistant Vulnavia, Phibes uses the Ten Plagues of Egypt as his inspiration, wearing an amulet with Hebrew letters corresponding with each plague as he conducts the murders. After three doctors have been killed, Inspector Trout, a detective from Scotland Yard, learns that they all had worked under the direction of Dr Vesalius, who tells him the deceased had been on his team when treating Victoria, as were four other doctors and one nurse. Trout discovers one of Phibes' amulets (torn off during a struggle) at the murder scene of the fourth doctor, which takes place while he is interviewing Vesalius. He first takes it to the jeweller who made it, then to a rabbi to learn its meaning. Now believing Phibes may still be alive, Trout and Vesalius go to the Phibes mausoleum at Highgate Cemetery. Inside they find a box of ashes in Phibes' coffin, but Trout deduces they are probably the remains of Phibes' chauffeur. Victoria's coffin is empty.

The police are unable to prevent Phibes from killing the remaining members of Vesalius' team, so they focus their efforts entirely on protecting Vesalius himself. Phibes kidnaps Vesalius' son Lem, then calls Vesalius and tells him to come alone to his mansion on Maldene Square if he wants to save his son's life. Trout refuses to let him go so Vesalius knocks the inspector unconscious, then races to Phibes' mansion, where he confronts him. Phibes tells him his son is under anaesthesia and prepared for surgery. Phibes has implanted a key near the boy's heart that will unlock his restraints. Vesalius has to surgically remove the key within six minutes (the same time Victoria was on the operating table) to release his son before acid from a container above Lem's head is released and kills him. Vesalius succeeds and moves the table out of the way. Vulnavia, who was ordered to destroy Phibes' mechanical creations, is surprised by Trout and his assistant; backing away, she is drenched with the acid and killed.

Convinced that he has accomplished his vendetta, Phibes retreats to the basement to inter himself in a stone sarcophagus containing the embalmed body of his wife. He proceeds to drain his blood while simultaneously replacing it with embalming fluid and lies down in the sarcophagus next to Victoria. The coffin's inlaid stone lid lowers into place, concealing it. Trout and the police arrive but cannot find Phibes. They recall that the "final curse" was darkness just before the basement goes dark.

Cast

Production
The film began as a script by writers James Whiton and William Goldstein. Studio American International Pictures purchased the script, seeing it as a good vehicle for their biggest star, Vincent Price. Director Robert Fuest rewrote most of the script, altering Dr. Phibes (who in the original script abused his assistant Vulnavia) to be more sympathetic. He also opted to add in some deliberate humor, since critics often razed Price for over-the-top performances, and changed the death of Dr. Kitaj by rats to take place on a plane instead of on a boat. Fuest found the boat death implausible, questioning why Kitaj could not save himself by simply jumping into the water. Peter Cushing was originally cast as Dr. Vesalius, but bowed out due to the illness of his wife and was replaced by Joseph Cotten. The film was shot on the "20s era" sets at Elstree Studios in Hertfordshire. The cemetery scenes were shot in Highgate Cemetery, London. The exterior of Dr. Phibes' mansion was Caldecote Towers at Immanuel College on Elstree Road.

Critical reception
Howard Thompson of The New York Times wrote, "The plot, buried under all the iron tinsel, isn't bad. But the tone of steamroller camp flattens the fun." Variety was generally positive, praising the "well-structured" screenplay, "outstanding" makeup for Vincent Price, and "excellent work" on the set designs. Gene Siskel of the Chicago Tribune gave the film three-and-a-half stars, calling it a "stylish, clever, shrieking winner", though he disliked "the lack of zip in the ending". David Pirie of The Monthly Film Bulletin was negative, faulting director Robert Fuest's "flat, unimaginative visual style" and a script "contriving to be coy and tongue-in-cheek without ever being witty".

In 2002 Critic Christopher Null called the film "Vincent Price at his campy best ... A crazy script and an awesome score make this a true classic."

In the early 2010s, Time Out conducted a poll with several authors, directors, actors, and critics who have worked within the horror genre to vote for their top horror films. The Abominable Dr. Phibes placed at number 83 on their top 100 list.

At the film review aggregator website Rotten Tomatoes, the film has an approval rating of 88% based on 40 reviews and an average rating of 6.97/10. The site's consensus reads: "The Abominable Dr. Phibes juggles horror and humor, but under the picture's campy façade, there's genuine pathos brought poignantly to life through Price's performance." The film was not highly regarded by American International Pictures' home office until it became a box office hit.

Home video
MGM Home Entertainment released The Abominable Dr. Phibes on Region 1 DVD in 2001, followed by a tandem release with Dr. Phibes Rises Again in 2005. The film made its Blu-ray debut as part of Scream Factory's Vincent Price box set in fall 2013.

A limited edition two-disc set, The Complete Dr. Phibes, was released in Region B Blu-ray in 2014 by Arrow Films. Both films were later reissued separately by Arrow and as part of the nine-film/seven-disc Region B Blu-ray set The Vincent Price Collection on the Australian Shock label.

The TV broadcast version of the film excises some of the more grisly scenes, such as a close-up of the nurse's locust-eaten corpse.

Music
The music that Phibes plays on the organ at the beginning of the film is "War March of the Priests" from Felix Mendelssohn's incidental music to Racine's play Athalie.

The film's incidental score was composed by Basil Kirchin and includes 1920s-era source music, most notably "Charmaine" and "Darktown Strutters' Ball".

One of several music-related errors or anachronisms within the film's storyline is the song overlaid as a recorded performance by one of the ostensibly mechanized musicians of "Dr. Phibes' Clockwork Wizards."  The pianist in this simulated animatronic band "sings" "One for My Baby (and One More for the Road)".  Although the film's plot is set in England in the 1920s, this particular song did not exist until 1943, when Harold Arlen and Johnny Mercer wrote it as part of their film score for The Sky's the Limit. Fred Astaire sang the jazz standard for the first time in that musical comedy. Likewise, the melody of the song "You Stepped Out of a Dream", written by Nacio Herb Brown (music) and Gus Kahn (lyrics) and first published in 1940, accompanies a scene depicting Dr. Phibes and Vulnavia dancing together in the ballroom of his mansion. Other musical anachronisms are Vulnavia's playing "Close Your Eyes" (1933) on the violin, or her placing in a car a music box that plays "Elmer's Tune" (1941).

A soundtrack LP was released concurrently with the film's appearance, which contained few selections from the score, but rather was composed mostly of character vocalizations by Paul Frees. A proper soundtrack was released on CD in 2004 by Perseverance Records, but it is now out of print.

Sequel
A sequel, Dr. Phibes Rises Again, was released in 1972. It was also directed by Robert Fuest and also stars Price as Phibes. Several other sequels were proposed, including "The Bride of Dr. Phibes", but none were ever produced.

Notes

References

Bibliography
 
 Humphreys, Justin, with contributions by Mark Ferelli, Sam Irvin, and David Taylor (2018). The Dr. Phibes Companion. Albany, Georgia: BearManor Media. .
 Klemensen, Richard; publisher. "The Definitive Dr. Phibes". Little Shoppe of Horrors. Des Moines, Iowa, October 2012: Number 29.

External links

 
 
 

1971 films
1971 horror films
1970s comedy horror films
1970s serial killer films
American International Pictures films
British black comedy films
British comedy horror films
British serial killer films
British films about revenge
Films about the ten plagues of Egypt
Films based on the Book of Exodus
Films directed by Robert Fuest
Films scored by Basil Kirchin
Films set in 1921
Films set in 1925
Films set in London
Films set in Switzerland
Films shot at EMI-Elstree Studios
Films shot in Hertfordshire
Mad scientist films
Prosthetics in fiction
1971 comedy films
British exploitation films
1970s English-language films
1970s British films